Acropora hyacinthus is a species of Acropora described from a specimen collected in Fiji by James Dwight Dana in 1846. It is thought to have a range that includes the Indian Ocean, the Indo-Pacific waters, southeast Asia, Japan, the East China Sea and the western Pacific Ocean. It lives on shallow reefs on upper reef slopes, and is found from depths of 1–25 m. Crown-of-thorns starfish preferentially prey upon Acropora corals.

Description
Acropora hyacinthus occurs in plate- or table-shaped wide colonies that consist of a number of thin branches in a lattice structure. It has strongly inclined branchlets. A. hyacinthus has axial dominant branches, i.e. each branch has a large dominant axial corallite with much smaller cup-shaped radial corallites. The corallites on specimens of Acropora hyacinthus are often darker than the main branch structure. The species looks similar to many tabular Acropora species and is often misidentified in the field.

Growth rate

 Branching corals of the genus Acropora are among the fastest-growing taxa on most coral reefs.

 A. hyacinthus, average growth rates range from \3 to 10 cm diameter increase per year, with much of this variation thought to be a response to temperature, in addition to competition and other abiotic and biotic factors (Tomascik et al. 1996; Wakeford et al. 2008;Linares et al. 2011).

Distribution
Like most corals,  Acropora hyacinthus is classed as a data deficient species on the IUCN Red List, but it is believed that its population is decreasing in line with the global decline in reefs, and it is listed under Appendix II of CITES. Figures of its population are unknown, but is likely to be threatened by the global reduction of coral reefs, the increase of temperature causing coral bleaching, climate change, human activity, the crown-of-thorns starfish (Acanthaster planci) and disease. It occurs in the Indian Ocean, the Indo-Pacific waters, southeast Asia, Japan, the East China Sea, Australia, and the western Pacific Ocean.

Taxonomy
The species was originally described by James Dwight Dana in 1846 as Madrepora hyacinthus. Currently this species is considered to be a species complex, with many of the synonyms being called into question.

References

Acropora
Animals described in 1971